Palestine: Peace Not Apartheid is a New York Times Best Seller book written by 39th President of the United States Jimmy Carter. It was published by Simon & Schuster in November 2006.

During his presidency, Carter hosted talks between Menachem Begin of Israel and Anwar Sadat of Egypt that led to the Egypt–Israel peace treaty. 

In this book Carter argues that Israel's continued control and construction of settlements have been the primary obstacles to a comprehensive peace agreement in the Middle East. That perspective, coupled with the use of the word Apartheid in the titular phrase Peace Not Apartheid, and what critics said were errors and misstatements in the book, sparked controversy. Carter has defended his book and countered that response to it "in the real world…has been overwhelmingly positive."

The documentary Man from Plains (2007) depicts the book tour Carter undertook to promote his book.

Purpose, main argument, and major points

"The ultimate purpose"

Thesis: How to achieve "permanent peace in the Middle East"
Carter identifies "two interrelated obstacles to permanent peace in the Middle East":

To bring an end to what he calls "this continuing tragedy", in Chapter 17 ("Summary"), Carter calls for a revitalization of the peace process based on the following three "key requirements":

The Apartheid analogy
Regarding the use of the word "Apartheid" in the title of his book, Carter has said:

In remarks broadcast over radio, Carter claimed that Israel's policies amounted to an apartheid worse than South Africa's:

"Some major points"
In his op-ed "Reiterating the Keys to Peace", published in The Boston Globe on 20 December 2006, Carter summarizes "[s]ome major points in the book":

Critical reaction and commentary

Critical response to Palestine: Peace Not Apartheid at the time of release was mixed. According to Julie Bosman, criticism of the book "has escalated to a full-scale furor," much of which has focused on Carter's use of the word "apartheid" in the subtitle. Some critics, including several leaders of the Democratic Party and of American Jewish organizations, have interpreted the subtitle as an allegation of Israeli apartheid, which they believe to be inflammatory and unsubstantiated. Tony Karon, Senior Editor at TIME.com and a former anti-Apartheid activist for the ANC, said: "Jimmy Carter had to write this book precisely because Palestinian life and history is not accorded equal value in American discourse, far from it. And his use of the word apartheid is not only morally valid; it is essential, because it shakes the moral stupor that allows many liberals to rationalize away the daily, grinding horror being inflicted on Palestinians in the West Bank and Gaza". Former President Bill Clinton wrote a brief letter to the chairman of the American Jewish Committee, thanking him for articles criticizing the book and citing his agreement with Dennis Ross's attempts to "straighten ... out" Carter's claims and conclusions about Clinton's own summer 2000 Camp David peace proposal.

Critics claim that Carter crossed the line into anti-Semitism. Abraham Foxman, the national director of the Anti-Defamation League, initially accused Carter of "engaging in anti-Semitism" in the book; Foxman told James Traub later that he would not call the former president himself an "anti-Semite" or a "bigot". Ethan Bronner also asserted that Carter's "overstatement" in the book "hardly adds up to anti-Semitism."

Some journalists and academics have praised Carter for what they believe to be speaking honestly about the Israeli–Palestinian conflict in a media environment described as hostile to opponents of Israel's policies. Some left-leaning Israeli politicians such as Yossi Beilin and Shulamit Aloni argued that Carter's critique of Israeli policy in the Palestinian territories reflects that of many Israelis themselves.

Carter's response to criticism of the book

Carter has responded to negative reviews in the mainstream news media in an op-ed published in the Los Angeles Times (which was excerpted in The Guardian and elsewhere):

He also wrote a "Letter to Jewish Citizens of America" explaining "his use of the term 'apartheid' and sympathizing with Israelis who fear terrorism."

In a report updated by the Associated Press after the publication of Carter's "Letter to Jewish Citizens of America", Greg Bluestein observes that Carter replied generally to complaints of the book's errors and inaccuracies by Dennis Ross, Alan Dershowitz, Kenneth Stein, the Simon Wiesenthal Center, and others by pointing out that the Carter Center staff as well as an "unnamed 'distinguished' reporter" fact-checked it. Rachel Zelkowitz points out that, as cited in various news accounts, "Carter has consistently defended his book's accuracy against Stein and other critics"; in a prepared statement, Carter's press secretary Deanna Congileo responds "that Carter had his book reviewed for accuracy throughout the writing process" and that "[a]s with all of President Carter's previous books, any detected errors will be corrected in later editions ..." In response to the Associated Press's request for a comment on the resignations of Stein and 14 other members of the Center's Board of Councilors, speaking on behalf of both Carter and the Carter Center, Congileo provided a statement from its executive director, John Hardman, who, according to Zelkowitz, "also fact checked Palestine, saying that the members of that board 'are not engaged in implementing the work of the Center.

Public and other programs pertaining to the book
Carter has said that debate on Israel-related issues is muffled in the US media by lobbying efforts of the pro-Israel lobby: "[M]any controversial issues concerning Palestine and the path to peace for Israel are intensely debated among Israelis and throughout other nations — but not in the United States. . . . This reluctance to criticize any policies of the Israeli government is because of the extraordinary lobbying efforts of the American-Israel Political Action Committee [sic] and the absence of any significant contrary voices." He has stressed that through the debate he hopes this book will stimulate and through his own related public-speaking and media appearances, he hopes to tear down the "impenetrable wall" that stops the people of the US from seeing the plight of Palestinians.

Brandeis University visit
In early December 2006 Brandeis University invited Carter to visit the university to debate his book with Alan Dershowitz. Carter declined that invitation, explaining: "I don't want to have a conversation even indirectly with Dershowitz. There is no need to for me to debate somebody who, in my opinion, knows nothing about the situation in Palestine." Carter said that the Brandeis debate request "is proof that many in the United States are unwilling to hear an alternative view on the nation's most taboo foreign policy issue, Israel's occupation of Palestinian territory," adding: "There is no debate in America about anything that would be critical of Israel."

Dershowitz criticized Carter's refusal to debate him, asserting: "Carter’s refusal to debate wouldn't be so strange if it weren't for the fact that he claims that he wrote the book precisely so as to start debate over the issue of the Israel-Palestine peace process. If that were really true, Carter would be thrilled to have the opportunity to debate." He later wrote in The Case Against Israel's Enemies that Carter's accusation of his ignorance was untrue "since we had discussed my several visits to the Palestinian Authority during our conversation only months earlier in Herzliya." 

In a Boston Globe article of 22 December 2006, Patricia Johnston said she and many colleagues had offered to chip in perhaps $100 each to pay for whatever travel and security costs a Carter visit would entail. "Who is Alan Dershowitz?" Johnston said. Carter "is the former president of the United States, who has done so much to further the cause of peace in the Middle East and elsewhere. It's an insult to suggest that he should have to defend himself that way." She said she envisioned Carter giving a traditional speech and taking audience questions.

On 26 December 2006, WCVB-TV (an ABC-TV affiliate), reported that "[a]bout 100 students, faculty and alumni of Brandeis University have signed an online petition to push the administration to bring former President Carter to campus to discuss his new book on Palestine, without being required to debate it."

The Boston Globe reported that since it initially revealed "that Carter felt unwelcome on the Waltham campus, people have argued over whether he is unwilling to answer for his views, or whether Brandeis, which was founded by the American Jewish community, can't tolerate criticism of Israel. The latter is a view that some professors hope they can dispel by reviving the Carter visit."

On 10 January 2007, it was reported that Carter would discuss Palestine Peace Not Apartheid at Brandeis University but that he would "not, however, debate the book with" Dershowitz. Brandeis officials reported that Carter would "be the first former president to visit Brandeis since Harry Truman delivered the commencement address in 1957.... It will be Carter's first visit to a university to discuss the book, [Carter's spokeswoman Deanna] Congileo said", confirming also "the president has set no conditions and would answer as many questions as possible"; Carter plans to "speak for about 15 minutes and then answer questions for 45 minutes during the visit."

The speech, which occurred on 23 January 2007, was "closed to the public and limited to 'members of the university community only'"; nevertheless, Dershowitz said that he still planned to "attend and question Carter": "'I will be the first person to have my hand up to ask him a question,' he said. 'I guarantee that they won't stop me from attending.'"

On 18 January 2007 news outlets reported Brandeis's announcement that while Dershowitz could not attend Carter's speech, after it ended he would have the stage for a "rebuttal."

The day after the speech (24 January 2007), The New York Times reported on the program: "Questions were preselected by the committee that invited Mr. Carter, and the questioners included an Israeli student and a Palestinian student. After Mr. Carter left, Mr. Dershowitz spoke in the same gymnasium, saying that the former president oversimplified the situation and that his conciliatory and sensible-sounding speech at Brandeis belied his words in some other interviews." According to David Weber of ABC News, Carter said "that he stood by the book and its title, that he apologized for what he called an 'improper and stupid' sentence in the book [which he acknowledged seemed to justify terrorism by saying that suicide bombings should end when Israel accepts the goals of the road map to peace with Palestinians and which he had already instructed his publisher to remove from its future editions,] and that he had been disturbed by accusations that he was anti-Semitic....  [Carter]...acknowledged...that 'Palestine Peace Not Apartheid' has 'caused great concern in the Jewish community,' but noted that it has nonetheless prompted discussion." An editorial published in the Waltham, Massachusetts newspaper, the Daily News Tribune, concludes: "Carter succeeded in bringing to Brandeis a productive, civil debate." Videotaped excerpts from Carter's visit to Brandeis were featured on several national news programs in the United States, such as NBC's morning program Today, along with follow-up interviews with Carter.

As a result of the visit, major donors told Brandeis University that they would no longer give it money in "retaliation", according to Stuart Eizenstat, chief domestic policy adviser and executive director of the White House Domestic Policy Staff during Carter's presidency and a current trustee of Brandeis, as quoted in The Jewish Week in mid-February 2007.

Man from Plains: Documentary feature film by Jonathan Demme
In 2007 Jonathan Demme made the film Man from Plains, which "follows the former President as he takes part in a book tour across America to publicise his new tome, Palestine Peace Not Apartheid." According to the Boston Globe Demme filmed Carter for three months "to compile footage for a documentary about the former president's book and Carter's efforts to increase debate on the Israeli–Palestinian conflict." While it granted camera access to members of the news media for their broadcasts, Brandeis University refused Demme's request to film Carter's January 2007 speech for the end of the film, citing logistical and legal considerations. The film debuted at the Toronto International Film Festival on 10 September 2007.

Carter Center conversation
On 22 February 2007 Carter participated in a "conversation" about Palestine Peace Not Apartheid with former Secretary of State Madeleine Albright at the Carter Center, moderated by Conflict Resolution Program Director Matthew Hodes. The event sold out in early January 2007. It was simultaneously webcast in the Carter Center's online "multi-media" section, and the Center's website now includes a direct link to the "archived webcast."

George Washington University visit

On 8 March 2007 George Washington University hosted a visit by Carter during which he discussed his book. According to reporter Beth Schwartzapfel in The Forward, a group of Jewish students led by Robert Fishman, executive director of the campus Hillel, dominated the microphones, preventing other students from asking questions, while asking questions critical of Carter prepared, forwarded, and distributed to them in advance by faculty and students at Emory University as if they were their own questions:
The sheet distributed to students listed five questions. Among the issues raised were Carter's refusal to debate Harvard Law School professor Alan Dershowitz and former U.S. Middle East negotiator Dennis Ross; continuing Palestinian violence in Gaza; Carter's assertion that Israel did not accept Clinton's peace proposal; whether donations from the Saudi royal family explains  the failure of the Carter Center to criticize human rights abuses in Saudi Arabia, and Carter's decision to use the word "apartheid" in his book's title.

One of the students involved in distributing the handout, Aviva Berman, said that four of the five questions came directly from a list prepared by Deborah Lipstadt and other professors at Emory University, prior to Carter's appearance at the school's Atlanta campus. "When Carter came to speak at Emory, they had those questions made up, so they just forwarded them to me", she said.

Schwartzapfel also cites "[a] video of the event, posted to the G.W. Web site, [which] shows that Carter received several standing ovations and long stretches of applause." "But", Schwartzapfel continues, "an Associated Press story that ran immediately after the event characterized the audience as 'polite but mostly critical,'" adding: "Jack Stokes, an A.P. spokesman, told the Forward that the article's description of the audience 'was based on reporter Barry Schweid's observation of the speech, as well as the subsequent Q&A Carter engaged in with the students. The A.P. story stands as written.'"

Schweid observes:
Despite the storm it ignited, former President Carter held fast on Thursday to his accusation that Israel oppresses the Palestinians on the West Bank and Gaza and seeks to colonize the land. Speaking at The George Washington University to a polite but mostly critical student audience, Carter offered no second thoughts on his book "Palestine Peace Not Apartheid". ... He said he was not accusing Israel of racism nor referring to its treatment of Arabs within the country. "I defined apartheid very carefully" as "the forced segregation by one people of another" on their own land, he said.

Schwartzapfel reports, however:
Brian Hennessey, vice president of the Vineeta Foundation, which is making a documentary on Carter, alleged to the Forward that he witnessed G.W. Hillel director Robert Fishman and several Jewish students conspiring to control the Q&A session. According to Hennessey, a handout was distributed with negative questions and then the students strategically grabbed the seats closest to the microphones. Hennessey said that he overheard people in the group saying that the point of their strategy was to make sure that Carter, whose book, Palestine Peace Not Apartheid, faced only tough questions.

In the end, most of the eight questions fielded by Carter at the March 8 event took a pro-Israel tack in challenging the former president. Four of the students read their questions off of the sheet distributed beforehand.

Fishman told the Forward, Schwartzapfel reports further: "'You know how we did it, honestly? ... We said, "Let's sit near the microphones." They each had a copy of the questions, and then they stood on line.'" Yet, she adds: "Hennessey asserted that the maneuver ended up influencing media coverage of the event. 'This small group successfully outgunned the microphones and managed to give some journalists this totally erroneous impression that that was how the student body felt about Carter,' he said." Whereas "Hennessey, who described Carter's book as 'very courageous,' contended that the G.W. students 'very successfully stood up and blocked anyone else from asking a question,'" Schwartzapfel continues:
Berman insisted that she and her fellow pro-Israel students did nothing wrong. It wasn’t his [Fishman's] group's responsibility "to let other people ask questions", he said. "If they wanted to get to the microphone quicker, they could have."
Fishman also rejected the assertion that the students' tactics were improper.
"There was nothing done in there to stop anyone from asking questions", Fishman said. "It's important that, when you have that many people in the room who may not be familiar with the Israeli–Palestinian situation, those people have the opportunity also to hear those areas that are questionable in the book."
In that sense, Fishman said, his group's approach "is what dialogue is about."

University of Iowa visit
Pointing out that "The former president rarely speaks about his book at universities. He says he’s been invited to more than 100 campuses, but he's only visited five," Claire Keller reported that, during his public appearance at the University of Iowa, in Iowa City, on 18 April 2007, Carter said, "I wrote this book to describe the plight of the Palestinians and because I'm convinced we desperately need debate about where we are and where we ought to be going, and how to rejuvenate the non-existent peace process in the Middle East" ... [and that] Carter says the book's objective is permanent peace for Israel and its neighbors; it’s something the former president says he’s dedicated his entire adult life to.

Keller wrote that "Many in attendance applaud his efforts" but that "others criticize the author, claiming his book contains factual errors and misstatements. Members of the local Jewish community say it's simply one-sided." She quotes Tali Ariav of the Hillel Jewish Student Center on the Iowa campus, who said, "'I am an Israeli so of course I served in the military, so I feel emotionally involved, but I feel every person, every American, every thinker needs to think twice about Carter's opinion, because it's not right' ..." Nevertheless, Keller added, "Carter adamantly defends the accuracy of his book, saying he wrote every word himself."

University of California, Irvine visit
On 3 May 2007, Carter presented a lecture and participated in a discussion relating to the book in conjunction with the Center for the Study of Democracy and Model United Nations, in association with the Center for Citizen Peacebuilding, Department of Political Science, at the University of California, Irvine. According to Carter's lecture transcript, in answering a question on whether conflict between pro- and anti-Israel student groups obstructs chances of peace, he said, "I think an altercation or debate or sometimes even an uncomfortable confrontation on a college campus in America is a good move in the right direction. But I would like to see the leaders of those two groups form a combined group that would take advantage of my invitation to go to Palestine and see what’s going on."

See also
 Arab–Israeli conflict
 Carter Center
 Israel and apartheid
 Israeli–Palestinian conflict
 Israeli–Palestinian peace process
 Israeli West Bank barrier
 Palestine

Notes

Further reading 
 Abunimah, Ali. One Country: A Bold Proposal to End the Israeli–Palestinian Impasse. New York: Metropolitan Books, 2006.  (10).  (13)
 Foxman, Abraham H. Never Again? The Threat of the New Anti-Semitism. New York: HarperSanFrancisco (an imprint of HarperCollins), 2003.  (10). 
 Konner, Melvin. Unsettled: An Anthropology of the Jews. Rpt. New York: Viking Adult, 2003.  (10).  (13)
 Ross, Dennis. The Missing Peace: The Inside Story of the Fight for Middle East Peace. Rpt. paperback ed. 2004; New York: Farrar, Straus & Giroux, 2005.   (10).  (13)
 Troy, Gil. Why I Am a Zionist: Israel, Jewish Identity and the Challenges of Today. 3rd ed. 2001; Montreal: Bronfman Jewish Education Centre, 2006.  (10).  (13)

External links

 Carter Q&A: Carter Question Blog3  hosted by Brandeis University faculty and students about the book pursuant to the Brandeis University visit by Jimmy Carter. Answers by Carter. Also presents links to transcript of Carter's opening remarks, books, and media coverage. (Registration required for participation)
 . Documentary film by Jonathan Demme focusing on Jimmy Carter's book tour for Palestine Peace Not Apartheid. 2007

2006 non-fiction books
Books about Palestinians
Books by Jimmy Carter
Books critical of Israel
Israel and apartheid
Israeli–Palestinian conflict books
Political science books
Books written by presidents of the United States